The Forrester family is a family in the CBS Daytime soap opera The Bold and the Beautiful. The Forresters own and run the Los Angeles-based fashion house Forrester Creations.

This is a list of all known members of the Forrester family, both past and present, deceased and living.

Family members

First generation
Eric Forrester (John McCook)Patriarch of the Forrester family. Father of Ridge, Thorne, Kristen, Felicia, Angela, Eric "Rick" Forrester, Jr. and Bridget Forrester, and adoptive father of Marcus Forrester.
John Forrester (Fred Willard)Occasionally mentioned brother of Eric Forrester, John was not seen until 2014. He is the father of Jessica Forrester and Ivy Forrester.

Second generation
Ridge Forrester (Thorsten Kaye)The eldest and favorite son of Eric and Stephanie Douglas, later found to be the biological son of Massimo Marone.  He is currently co-owner and CEO of Forrester Creations. He has four children: Thomas, Phoebe, Steffy and Ridge Forrester Jr.
Thorne Forrester (Winsor Harmon)The oldest biological child of Eric and Stephanie. He works for Forrester Creations. Thorne is often sidelined in favor of his older half-brother, Ridge. Although they've had their rivalries, Thorne and Ridge are good brothers and will support each other in times of crisis. He has one daughter, Alexandria Forrester.
Angela ForresterEric and Stephanie's eldest daughter who died from microcephaly. Never appeared on-screen. An impostor (portrayed by Judith Borne appeared from 1988–89, posing as a bed-ridden Angela; she was eventually discovered. She was believed to have died in an accident but resurfaced months later, and swore revenge on Stephanie. She disappeared in 1989 and has not been seen since.
Kristen Forrester Dominguez  (Tracy Melchior)Second oldest daughter of Eric and Stephanie. She was married to Clarke Garrison in the late 1980s, and is now married to the HIV-positive Tony Dominguez. The two have a son, Zende, who lived with them in Florida.
Felicia Forrester (Lesli Kay)The youngest daughter of Eric and Stephanie and also the only surviving Forrester child to never have been married. She has an infant son, Dominick ("Dino"), fathered by Dante Damiano. She was the head of public relations at Forrester Creations. She almost died from colon cancer in 2006.
Jessica Forrester (Maitland Ward)John's daughter with his ex-wife, Maggie. Following her parents' divorce she moved from Davenport, Iowa to Los Angeles to live with Eric and Stephanie between the years of 1994 and 1996. Afterwards she left town for London, England.
Ivy Forrester (Ashleigh Brewer)John's daughter with his second wife, Claire. She arrives in Los Angeles, after she is brought in to work for the new jewelry design collection, Hope for the Future (HFTF)).
Eric "Rick" Forrester Jr. (Jacob Young)Son of Eric and Brooke Logan. As a child he shot Grant Chambers, but repressed the memory. He has also had relationships with Caitlin Ramirez and Ridge Forrester's daughters Phoebe and Steffy and Ridge's ex-wife Taylor Hamilton as revenge against Ridge. He is the father of Lizzy Forrester.
Bridget Forrester (Ashley Jones)Daughter of Eric and Brooke Logan. She worked as a physician at University Hospital and as a head designer at Jackie M. She has one son, Logan. She now lives in New York with Owen, Jackie and Nick.
Marcus Forrester (formerly Marcus Walton) (Texas Battle)Eric's adoptive son with Donna Logan. He is the biological son of Donna and Justin Barber, though he was placed for adoption at birth. He  arrived in LA after hearing about his mother's wedding in the newspaper. He was adopted by Eric Forrester. He is the father of Rosie Forrester.

Third generation
Thomas Forrester (Matthew Atkinson)Oldest child of Ridge and Taylor Hamilton; was stated to be 18 in 2004. He had relationships with Caitlin Ramirez and Amber Moore, and was briefly married to illegal immigrant Gaby Moreno. He is the father of Douglas Forrester.
Steffy Forrester (Jacqueline MacInnes Wood)Daughter of Ridge and Taylor Hamilton; fraternal twin of Phoebe. Mother of Kelly Spencer and Hayes Finnegan.
Phoebe Forrester (MacKenzie Mauzy)Daughter of Ridge and Taylor Hamilton; fraternal twin sister of Steffy Forrester. She was stalked by Shane McGrath and later pursued a relationship with Rick Forrester. She died in December 2008 in a car accident in which Rick was the driver.
Alexandria "Aly" Forrester (Ashlyn Pearce)Daughter of Thorne and Darla Einstein. Returned as a teenager in November 2013. Died in 2015 after trying to kill Steffy Forrester.
Zende Forrester Dominguez (Delon De Metz)Adoptive son of Kristen and Tony Dominguez. They met him during their African honeymoon in 2002. Returns to Los Angeles in 2015 and works as an intern in Forrester Creations.
Dominick Forrester DamianoSon of Felicia and Dante Damiano. Conceived during a one-night stand in Nice, France in December 2004.
Ridge "R.J." Forrester Jr. (Anthony Turpel)Son of Ridge and Brooke Logan, born in July 2004. Prior to his birth he was thought to be the son of Nick Marone but after a paternity test was taken, just after his birth, it was proved he was Ridge's son.
Eric Forrester IIISon of Rick and Amber Moore, who was stillborn in 1999.
Nicole MaroneDaughter of Bridget and Nick Marone, who was stillborn in 2006.
Logan Forrester KnightSon of Bridget and Owen Knight, born on air September 3, 2010. He came out of a one-night-stand with Bridget and Owen. At the time, Bridget was married to Nick Marone.
Ambrosia "Rosie" Barber ForresterDaughter of Marcus and Amber Moore, born on air on June 20, 2011. She was initially thought to be the daughter of Liam Spencer or Oliver Jones.
Elizabeth Nicole "Lizzy" ForresterDaughter of Rick and Nicole Avant. Legally adopted by Maya Avant when Nicole gave up her parental rights because Maya is transgender.

Fourth generation
Douglas ForresterSon of Thomas and Caroline Spencer. Caroline was married to Ridge at the time, and when she revealed her pregnancy, Ridge said it couldn't be his child. The two, though, kept up the pretense that Douglas was Ridge's son, until Thomas found out. Though Caroline was reluctant to reveal Douglas' paternity, Ridge gave Douglas to Thomas so they could be a family. After Caroline's death, Douglas was adopted by Hope Logan.
Kelly SpencerDaughter of Steffy and Liam Spencer, born June 4, 2018.
Hayes Finnegan Son of Steffy and Dr. John "Finn" Finnegan, born on July 1, 2021. Full name: Hayes Forrester Finnegan.

In-laws
Stephanie Douglas (Susan Flannery) - Matriarch, Eric's wife (1957–90, 1999–2005, 2006–08, 2012); mother of Ridge, Angela, Kristen, Thorne and Felicia 
Brooke Logan (Katherine Kelly Lang) - Eric's wife (1991–93, 2005); Ridge's wife (1994–95, 1998, 2003–04, 2004–05, 2009, 2009–11, 2012, 2018–22); Thorne's wife (2001); mother of Rick, Bridget,and R.J.
Sheila Carter (Kimberlin Brown) - Eric's wife (1993–95)
Donna Logan (Jennifer Gareis) - Eric's wife (2008–10); mother of Marcus 
Quinn Fuller (Rena Sofer) - Eric's wife (2016–22); mother of Wyatt Spencer
Maggie Forrester (Barbara Crampton) - John's wife (divorced); mother of Jessica
Claire Forrester - John's wife; mother of Ivy
Taylor Hayes (Krista Allen) - Ridge's wife (1992–95, 1998–2006); mother of Thomas, Phoebe and Steffy
Caroline Spencer (Joanna Johnson) - Thorne's wife (1987–89); Ridge's wife (1990)
Macy Alexander (Bobbie Eakes) - Thorne's wife (1990–93, 1995–96, 2000–03)
Clarke Garrison (Daniel McVicar) - Kristen's husband (1988–90)
Tony Dominguez (Paulo Benedeti) - Kristen's husband (2001–); adoptive father of Zende
Darla Einstein (Schae Harrison) - Thorne's wife (2004–06); mother of Aly
Amber Moore (Adrienne Frantz) - Rick's wife (1999–2000, 2001–03); mother of Eric III and Rosie
Caroline Spencer (Linsey Godfrey) - Rick's wife (2013–15); Ridge's wife (2015–16); mother of Douglas
Maya Avant (Karla Mosley) - Rick's wife (2015–18); legal mother of Lizzy
Deacon Sharpe (Sean Kanan) - Bridget's husband (2001–03)
Nick Marone (Jack Wagner) - Bridget's husband (2005–06, 2008, 2009–10); mother of Nicole 
Dayzee Leigh (Krystolyn Lloyd) - Marcus' wife (2012—)
Gaby Moreno (Shanelle Workman) - Thomas' wife (2005–06)
Liam Spencer (Scott Clifton) - Steffy's husband (2011–12, 2013, 2017–18); Ivy's husband (2015); father of Kelly
Wyatt Spencer (Darin Brooks) - Steffy's husband (2016–17)
Nicole Avant (Reign Edwards) - Zende's wife (2017–20); mother of Lizzy
Katie Logan (Heather Tom) - Thorne's wife (2018–19)
Hope Logan (Annika Noelle) - Thomas' wife (2019); adoptive mother of Douglas
John Finnegan (Tanner Novlan) - Steffy's husband, (2021–); father of Hayes

Family tree

Descendants

Unknown man (deceased); married unknown woman (deceased) 
Eric Forrester (1935–); married Stephanie Douglas (1957–90, 1999–2005, 2006–08, 2012), Brooke Logan (1991–93, 2005–06), Sheila Carter (1993–95), Donna Logan (2008–10), Quinn Fuller (2016–22)
Ridge Forrester (1957–); Eric's legal son with Stephanie; married Caroline Spencer (1990), Taylor Hayes (1992–95, 1998–2006), Brooke Logan (1994–95, 1998, 2003–04, 2004–05, 2009, 2009–11, 2012, 2018–22), Caroline Spencer (2015–16)
Thomas Forrester (1986–); Ridge and Taylor's son; married Gabriela Moreno (2005–06), Hope Logan (2019)
Douglas Forrester (2016–); Thomas' son with Caroline Spencer, adopted by Hope
Steffy Forrester (1988–); Ridge and Taylor's daughter; twin; married Liam Spencer (2011–12, 2013, 2017–18), Wyatt Spencer (2016–17), John "Finn" Finnegan (2021–)
Kelly Spencer (2018–); Steffy and Liam's daughter
 Hayes Finnegan (2021–); Steffy and Finn's son
Phoebe Forrester (1988–2008); Ridge and Taylor's daughter; twin
R.J. Forrester (2000–); Ridge and Brooke's son
Kristen Forrester (1965–); Eric and Stephanie's daughter; married Clarke Garrison (1988–90), Antonio Dominguez (2002–)
Zende Forrester Dominguez; Kristen and Antonio's adopted son; married Nicole Avant (2017–20)
Angela Forrester (1963–1975); Eric and Stephanie's daughter
Thorne Forrester (1961–); Eric and Stephanie's son; married Caroline Spencer (1988–89), Macy Alexander (1990–93, 1995–96, 2000–03), Darla Einstein (2004–06), Katie Logan (2018–19)
Alexandria Forrester (1995–2015); Thorne and Darla's daughter
Felicia Forrester (1968–); Eric and Stephanie's daughter
Dominick Damiano (2005–); Felicia's son with Dante Damiano
Rick Forrester (1981–); Eric and Brooke's son; married Amber Moore (1999–2000, 2001–03), Caroline Spencer (2013–15), Maya Avant (2015–18)
Eric Forrester III (1999); Rick and Amber's son
Lizzy Forrester (2016–); Rick's daughter with Nicole Avant, adopted by Maya
Bridget Forrester (1983–); Eric and Brooke's daughter; married Deacon Sharpe (2001–03), Dominick Marone (2005–06, 2008, 2009–10)
Nicole Marone (2006); Bridget and Dominick's daughter
Logan Forrester Knight (2010–); Bridget's son with Owen Knight
Marcus Forrester; Eric's adopted son with Donna; married Dayzee Leigh (2012–)
Rosie Forrester (2011–); Marcus' daughter with Amber Moore
John Forrester; married Maggie Forrester (divorced), Claire Forrester (married)
Jessica Forrester; John and Maggie's daughter
Ivy Forrester; John and Claire's daughter; married Liam Spencer (2015)

References

The Bold and the Beautiful families
Fictional people in fashion
Television characters introduced in 1987